Aylesworth is an English surname. Notable people with this surname include the following:

 Allen Bristol Aylesworth (1854–1952), Canadian lawyer and parliamentarian
 Arthur Aylesworth (1883–1946), American actor
 John Aylesworth (1928–2010), Canadian television producer and comedian
 Michael Aylesworth (b. 1943), American politician
 Reiko Aylesworth (b. 1972), American film and television actress
 Wilbert Ross Aylesworth (died 1973), Canadian politician, farmer and merchant

English-language surnames